Stephen L. Fowler (born July 31, 1948) is an American inventor and electrical engineer, who is active in the fields of electrical engineering, electrostatics, and electrical forensic investigations. He has been used as an expert in many legal cases as well as on News and television programs such as ABC, NBC, CBS, Fox, Inside Edition, Dateline, and the Discovery Channel. His investigation videos have been used on the MythBusters program as well as The Oprah Winfrey Show. These investigations have dealt with electrostatic induced refueling fires and explosions, electrocutions in the streets, and the polonium-210 poisoning of the ex KGB agent-Aleksandr Litvinenko. His inventions have been featured on television programs such as Beyond 2000 and The Merv Griffin Show as well as in USA Today and the New York Times.

Biography

Fowler is founder and president of Fowler Associates, Inc. and two on-line magazines: the ESD Journal and the Rad Journal. He graduated cum laude with a BS in Electrical Engineering from the University of South Carolina. Fowler is the holder of many patents.

Fowler served in the U.S. Air Force from 1966-1970 as an electronics technician. He spent 14 months on islands in the South China Sea on radar installations and spent the rest of his service at Keesler Air Force Base, Mississippi and Charleston Air Force Base, South Carolina. Subsequently, Fowler completed his Electrical Engineering Degree at the University of South Carolina.

In 1974 Fowler joined the Cryovac Division of W.R. Grace and Company, where he helped found a new engineering department for electron beam irradiation of polymers. In 1986 Fowler was asked to help develop Cryovac's new electronics plastics division, ESD Products. From 1988 until 1991, he was the technical and market manager for the EP Films Product line at Cryovac. Fowler left Cryovac in 1991 to become Vice President of Sales at United Technical Products in Canton, Massachusetts and in 1992 became Vice President at Rapid-Fill USA, that produced a patented product that he helped invent, an inflatable dunnage package. In 1993, Fowler helped found both ESD Flooring Systems, Inc., which produced conductive carpeting for ESD safe areas, and Fowler Associates, Inc.

References 

Inside Edition: Gas Pump Fires Article
Inside Edition: Hot Streets Article
Dateline NBC: Last Days of a Secret Agent Article
Stephen's Biography on His Website

1948 births
American electrical engineers
Living people